Fairview International School is an International Baccalaureate (IB) school, headquartered in Wangsa Maju, Kuala Lumpur. It also has campuses in Subang Jaya, Ipoh, Penang Island, and Johor Bahru.

Background

Fairview International School’s campuses are authorised to offer the three IB programmes: the Primary Years Programme (PYP) for students aged 5 to 10 years, the Middle Years Programme (MYP) for students aged 11 to 17 years, as well as the Diploma Programme (DP) for students aged 17 to 19 years, giving some campuses the IB continuum recognition.

Fairview International School campuses total to about 4,000 students, representing over 55 nationalities.

The campuses and their authorised IB programmes are as follows:

 Kuala Lumpur - Primary Years Programme, Middle Years Programme, and the Diploma Programme
 Subang Jaya - Primary Years Programme and Middle Years Programme
 Penang - Primary Years Programme, Middle Years Programme, and the Diploma Programme
 Johor - Primary Years Programme and Middle Years Programme
 Ipoh Campus - Primary Years Programme and Middle Years Programme

Subjects 
In the MYP, students study the following subject groups, in line with MYP on-screen examinations and ePortfolio known as eAssessment:

 Language & Literature: English or Mandarin
 Mathematics: Standard (for both lower and upper MYP) or Extended (for upper MYP)
 General Science (for lower MYP) or the Sciences: Biology, Chemistry, and/or Physics (for upper MYP)
 Language Acquisition: Mandarin (at the emergent, capable, or proficient level)
 Physical and Health Education
 Performing Arts: Music (not available for ePortfolio)
 Visual Arts
 Design
 Individuals & Societies: Integrated Humanities

Students at the lower level of MYP (M1 to M3) will take all subjects, while upper MYP students (M4 to M5) will have to attend classes according to their subject choice. Additionally, all Malaysian students are required to take Bahasa Melayu, in line with MOE requirements and guidelines.

Outdoor learning 
In Fairview, grade levels P5 to M5 have two academic expedition trips overseas in line with their studies, alongside camps to Fairview Eduresort in Port Dickson every academic year. Common destinations typically include Southeast Asian countries, such as Singapore, Indonesia, Vietnam, Cambodia, Thailand; upper MYP grades typically visit countries such as China, Australia, and the UK. The Port Dickson camps apply to all students from P4 onwards.

References 

1978 establishments in Malaysia
Educational institutions established in 1978
International Baccalaureate schools in Malaysia
 Cambridge schools in Malaysia